Koche Munda is an Indian politician and member of the Bharatiya Janata Party. Munda is a member of the Jharkhand Legislative Assembly from the Torpa constituency in Khunti district.

References 

People from Khunti district
Bharatiya Janata Party politicians from Jharkhand
Members of the Jharkhand Legislative Assembly
Living people
21st-century Indian politicians
Year of birth missing (living people)